The Lost Father is a novel written by American novelist Mona Simpson. It is the sequel to Simpson's first novel, Anywhere But Here and based on her real search for her father, Abdulfattah ‘John’ Jandali. It also contains a fictionalized portrait of her mother, Joanne Carole Schieble. Jandali and Schieble are Steve Jobs' birth parents (although this fact does not appear in the novel).

External links 
 

1992 novels
Arab-American novels
Novels by Mona Simpson
American autobiographical novels